Astragalus sesameus is a species of plant in the family Fabaceae.

Sources

References 

sesameus
Flora of Malta